Ludwig Benjamin (1825–48) was a German botanist who contributed to Carl Friedrich Philipp von Martius' Flora Brasiliensis. The genus Benjaminia (in the Plantaginaceae family) is named in his honour.

References

See also 
World Dictionary of Plant Names - Ludwig Benjamin

1825 births
1848 deaths
19th-century German botanists